Mineshope is a hamlet in the parish of St Gennys, Cornwall, England.

References

Hamlets in Cornwall